Norilsk is a two piece doom/sludge rock band from Gatineau, Quebec, Canada.

Overview
Norilsk was named after Norilsk, the northerly Russian mining and industrial Siberian town. It was founded in 2012. The two main band members are Nic Miquelon (instruments and vocals) and Nick Richer (drums, backing vocals), together with other collaborators.

The band sings in mostly French, and performs in the "doom-death" metal style.

Discography
As of 2018.
Japetus, EP, 2014
The Idea Of North, Album, 2015
Le Passage des glaciers, Album, 2017
Weepers of the Land, Album, 2018

References

External links
norilskdoom.com

Canadian noise rock groups
Musical groups from Gatineau
Musical groups established in 2012
2012 establishments in Quebec